Scolitantides is a Palearctic genus of butterfly in the family Lycaenidae. The genus is monotypic, containing the single species Scolitantides orion (Pallas, 1771).

References

Polyommatini
Monotypic butterfly genera
Lycaenidae genera
Taxa named by Jacob Hübner